Spring Run may refer to:

Spring Run, Pennsylvania, an unincorporated community in Franklin County, Pennsylvania
Spring Run (Solomon Creek), a stream in Luzerne County, Pennsylvania
Spring Run (West Branch Susquehanna River), a stream in Northumberland County, Pennsylvania